Huda Beer is a lager beer produced and bottled in Huế, Vietnam, by Hue Brewery Ltd. The lager won a silver medal at the World Beer Championships in 2013.

Huda is available as canned, bottled and draught beer.

Hue Brewery Ltd.'s headquarters are located at Nguyen Sinh Cung Street in the city of Huế, Thừa Thiên–Huế Province, on the Perfume River.

The company that owned the brand is acquired by Carlsberg Group.

In 2020, the Huda beer brand was awarded a Gold Medal at the Monde Selection Awards.

See also 
 List of companies in Vietnam

References

External links 
 Official website

Culture in Huế
Beer in Vietnam
Vietnamese brands